James Riley Brogan (born February 24, 1958) is a retired American basketball player.

Born in Merion Station, Pennsylvania, he played collegiately for the West Virginia Wesleyan College.

He played for the San Diego Clippers (1981–83) in the NBA for 121 games.
He is currently coaching basketball players, primarily working on their shooting form. He has also trained with professional sports figures to improve their balance and coordination. He had 619 points in his NBA career.

External links

1958 births
Living people
Atlantic City Hi-Rollers players
Basketball players from Pennsylvania
Guards (basketball)
Mississippi Jets players
People from Ardmore, Pennsylvania
People from Lower Merion Township, Pennsylvania
San Diego Clippers players
Undrafted National Basketball Association players
West Virginia Wesleyan Bobcats basketball players
Sportspeople from Montgomery County, Pennsylvania
American men's basketball players
Lower Merion High School alumni